Dial 100 is a 2021 Indian Hindi-language thriller drama film directed by Rensil D'Silva and produced by Sony Pictures Films India, Siddharth P.Malhotra and Sapna Malhotra. The film stars Manoj Bajpayee, Neena Gupta and Sakshi Tanwar in the lead roles. The film premiered on 6 August 2021 on ZEE5. it was loosely inspired from the Danish film The Guilty.

Plot
Nikhil Sood is an overworked and underpaid police officer who one night gets a call on the emergency helpline number 100 from a woman who  is threatening to commit suicide.
Nikhil asks for her details and says he needs that in order to help her but the woman firstly hesitates and then refuses saying she is going to die soon anyway.

Nikhil's wife Prerna phones to alert him that she thinks their son Dhruv could be back to his old habits of being a drug peddler. She continues to tell him that Dhruv leaves home late at night same as when he leaves for his late night shift.
Nikhil rings his son and somehow makes him understand and return home quickly. But before that the mysterious women who called Nikhil threatening suicide reaches his house and holds Prerna captive. The woman forces Prerna to sit in her car and calls Nikhil after having a second conversation he realizes that she is Seema Palav whose son died in hit a run case and a rich spoilt brat Yash Mehra's car was the one that hit him. The case got shut down due to pressure from the city's big wigs and the woman thinks Dhruv also had a hand in it.
Seema's motive is only revenge by killing Yash, hence the reason she has kidnapped Prerna. She wants Dhruv to get Yash to her. Whether she succeeds forms the rest of the story.

Cast
 Manoj Bajpayee as Senior Inspector Nikhil Sood
 Neena Gupta as Seema Paalav
 Sakshi Tanwar as Prerna Sood, Nikhil's wife
 Nandu Madhav as Chandrakant Paalav aka Chandu, Seema's husband
 Abhijeet Chavan as Inspector Gharat
 Urmila Mahanta as Gayatri
 Vikram Bham as Najeeb
 Madhur Arora as Suresh Nayak
 Deepanshu Titoriya as Avi
 Girish Dixit as Ashish Deshmukh
 Virandra Giri as Sangha
 Svar Kamble as Dhruv Sood, Nikhil's son
 Ivan Sylvester Rodrigues as Gautam Mehra
 Nilesh Mamgain as Gulam Ahmed
 Aman Gandotra as Yash Mehra, Gautam's son

Production 
The Principal photography commenced on 1 December 2020 in Mumbai.

Reception
Rahul Desai of Film Companion wrote, "Even though Dial 100 gets its nihilistic messaging on point, the gimmicky execution ensures the film is about as surprising as a traffic jam in Andheri East."

References

External links 
 
 Dial 100 at ZEE5
 

Films shot in Mumbai
2020s Hindi-language films
2021 thriller drama films
Indian thriller drama films
Columbia Pictures films
Sony Pictures films
Sony Pictures Networks India films